WDMG-FM (97.9 FM, "97.9 WDMG") is a radio station broadcasting a hot adult contemporary format. Licensed to Ambrose, Georgia, United States, the station serves the Douglas, Georgia, area. The station is currently owned by Broadcast South, LLC.

History
The station was assigned the call letters WKAA on June 27, 1983.  On May 9, 1989, the station changed its call sign to WSPX, on December 5, 1989, to WKAA, and on September 10, 2004, to the current WDMG. It served the South Georgia area as "97.9 The Big Dog" from 2004 to 2016, before dropping "The Big Dog" image.

References

External links

DMG-FM
Hot adult contemporary radio stations in the United States
Radio stations established in 1983